No 295 Squadron RAF was an airborne forces and transport squadron of the Royal Air Force during World War II.  It was the first unit to be equipped with the Armstrong Whitworth Albemarle transport and glider tug aircraft.

History

With the Airborne Forces

No. 295 Squadron was formed on 3 August 1942 at RAF Netheravon as an airborne forces unit, equipped with Whitley Mk.Vs.  These were from November 1942 used in leaflet dropping missions over France, supplemented in February 1943 with Halifax Mk.Vs, which they used in Operation Beggar. By October 1943 the squadron converted to the Albemarle Mk.I. With these aircraft the squadron shared – with 570 Sqn. – the honour of being the first to drop troops over Normandy on the eve of D-Day, while other aircraft of the squadron towed gliders to the landing zones.
The Albemarles gave way in July 1944 to the Stirling Mk.IV. The squadron used these aircraft during the Battle of Arnhem during Operation Market Garden, again towing gliders.

In early October 1944, Short Stirlings of the RAF's No 295 Squadron took up residence at RAF Rivenhall, with most of its operations consisting of supply drops to Norwegian resistance forces and similar activities over the Netherlands and Denmark.  The last assault action with the Stirlings was on 24 March 1945, when the unit took part in Operation Varsity, the crossing of the Rhine.  The Stirlings further provided service carrying troops to Norway to disarm the Germans there when the war was over.  The squadron was disbanded at Rivenhall on 14 January 1946.

With Transport Command
On 21 January 1946 190 squadron was renumbered to 295 squadron as a Transport Squadron (Rawlings claims 1 February, and does not mention the renumbering), flying Halifaxes of the A.7 type.  It was soon disbanded however, on 1 April 1946 at RAF Tarrant Rushton, the same airfield where it had been reformed and renumbered to No. 297 Squadron RAF

With the Airborne Forces again
The squadron was reformed again as an airborne forces squadron on 10 September 1947 at RAF Fairford, again flying Halifaxes, but now the A.9 type. After a little more than a year it disbanded again, at Fairford on 1 October 1948.

Aircraft operated

Squadron airfields

Commanding officers

References

Notes

Bibliography

External links

 Site with pages for all squadron of No 38 Group RAF
 Squadron history on MOD site

295
No. 295
Military units and formations established in 1942
Military units and formations disestablished in 1948